Eustichia is the only genus of moss in family Eustichiaceae.

References

Dicranales
Moss genera